Vulcan Productions  produced documentary films, television programming and virtual reality experiences that drove awareness around environmental and social issues. The company was founded in 1997 by late Microsoft co-founder Paul Allen and his sister Jody Allen. It closed in 2021.

The company financed and co-produced films with directors such as Martin Scorsese, Clint Eastwood and Robert Redford. Its films and TV series had aired on video on-demand services like Netflix, HBO and Hulu and across networks like The Discovery Channel and National Geographic. Films produced by Vulcan Productions won Peabody Awards and received Academy Award nominations. The company focused on raising awareness on issues like mental health, girl's education, veterans, parenting, wildlife conservation, ocean health, climate change and modern-day slavery.

History 
Vulcan Productions began under the name "Clear Blue Sky Productions" and received its first critical success with the feature film Titus (1999). The company continued to produce feature films including Far From Heaven, Where God Left His Shoes, and Hard Candy. With a name change in 2011, the then-Vulcan Productions shifted its measure of success from box office numbers and critical ratings to driving social impact and world change. The company exclusively produced Social impact entertainment with a focus on topics ranging from wildlife and conservation, global health, contemporary social issues, science, technology, history and exploration.

As part of the larger Vulcan Inc. organization, Vulcan Productions’ mission was to “change minds and ignite action through the power of storytelling.”

On May 27, 2020 Vulcan Inc. announced that Vulcan Productions would be shutdown in 2021 citing the "economic impacts of the COVID-19 crisis" as well as "the ongoing transition after Paul Allen's passing in 2018." A few weeks after winning top honors at the Sundance Film Festival for Summer of Soul, Vulcan Productions ceased operations.

Films

Where God Left His Shoes
 Winner – The Humanitas Prize: 2008 Best Sundance Feature Film
 2008 Imagen Awards
 Nominated - Best Film 
 Nominated - Best Actor - John Leguizamo 
 Nominated - Best Supporting Actor - David Castro
 Winner - Best Supporting Actress - Leonor Varela 

Bickford Shmeckler's Cool Ideas
 2006 U.S. Comedy Arts Festival
 Best Actress - Olivia Wilde

Hard Candy (film)
 2006 Malaga Film Festival
 Best Film
 Best Director - David Slade
 Best Actress - Elliot Page
 Best Cinematographer - Jo Willems
 2005 Sitges Film Festival
 Best Motion Picture
 Best Screenplay
 Audience Award for Best Motion Picture 

Coastlines

Far from Heaven
 75th Annual Academy Award nominations
 Best Actress in a Leading Role - Julianne Moore
 Best Cinematography - Edward Lachman
 Best Writing (Original Screenplay) - Todd Haynes
 Best Music (Score) - Elmer Bernstein
 Independent Spirit Awards winner:
 Best Picture
 Best Director - Todd Haynes
 Best Female Lead - Julianne Moore
 Best Supporting Male - Dennis Quaid
 Best Cinematography - Edward Lachman, A.S.C.
 Golden Globe Award nominations:
 Best Actress - Julianne Moore (Drama)
 Best Supporting Actor - Dennis Quaid
 Best Screenplay - Todd Haynes
 Best Music Score - Elmer Bernstein

The Safety of Objects
 Deauville Festival of American Film
 International Critics Prize
 Best Performance: Patricia Clarkson,
 Ralph Lauren Fragrances Prize
 Seattle Women in Cinema Film Festival
 Third-place prize
 San Sebastian International Film Festival
 Nominated: Golden Seashell Award

The Luzhin Defence

Titus
 2000 Academy Awards
 Nominated: Best Costume Design
 2000 Art Directors Guild
 Nominated: Excellence in Production Design Award
 2000 Italian National Syndicate of Film Journalists
 Winner: Silver Ribbon Award – Best Production Design
 2000 Edgar Allan Poe Awards
 Nominated: Best Motion Picture
 2000 Las Vegas Film Critics Society Awards
 Nominated: Sierra Award – Best Costume Design
 Best Screenplay – Adapted
 2000 Satellite Awards
 Winner: Gold Satellite – Best Performance by an Actor in a Supporting Role, Drama
 Nominated: Best Art Direction, Production Design
 Best Costume Design
 Best Performance by an Actress in a Supporting Role, Drama
 Best Screenplay – Adapted
 Best Visual Effects
 2001 London Critics Circle Film Awards
 Nominated: Best British Actor of the Year

Men with Guns

Notes

References

External links

Film production companies of the United States
Companies based in Seattle
Documentary film production companies